Michael Belkin may refer to:
 Mike Belkin (born 1945), Canadian tennis player
 Michael Belkin (ophthalmologist), Israeli academic and researcher